Kammersänger (male) or Kammersängerin (female), abbreviated Ks. or KS, is a German honorific title for distinguished singers of opera and classical music.  It literally means "chamber singer". Historically, the title was bestowed by princes or kings, when it was styled Hofkammersänger(in), where hof refers to the royal court.

The title is given in Germany and in Austria usually on the recommendation of relevant national and local institutions. In East Germany, some concert halls bestowed this designation.

Titles and recipients

Austria

Österreichischer Kammersänger (male) / Österreichische Kammersängerin (female)
The honorary title is awarded by the Federal President of Austria on the proposal of the responsible Federal Minister since 1971.

Germany

Kammersänger (male) / Kammersängerin (female)
 Elise Kutscherra de Nyss (Coburg, 1894)
 Gerhard Unger (1952)
 Theo Adam (1955)
 Hans-Dieter Bader (Hanover, 1981)
 Alfred Vökt (Frankfurt, 1989)
  (Frankfurt, 1993)
 Axel Köhler (Halle, 1998)
 Klaus Schneider (Karlsruhe, 2003)
 Linda Watson (Düsseldorf, 2004)
 Doris Soffel (Cologne, 2007)
 Hans-Otto Weiß (Mainz, 2010)
 Winfrid Mikus (Heidelberg, 2011)
 Roland Hartmann (Meiningen, 2011)
 Romelia Lichtenstein (Halle, 2012)
 Hannes Brock (Dortmund, 2012)
 Jörg Sabrowski (Kiel, 2012)
 Thomas de Vries (Wiesbaden, 2014)
 Jochen Kupfer (Nürnberg, 2016)
 Thomas Jesatko (Mannheim, 2016)
  (Erfurt, 2017)
 Jeffrey Dowd (Essen, 2019)
 Claudia Mahnke (Frankfurt, 2021)
 Christina Clark (Essen, 2022)
 Marie-Helen Joël (Essen, 2022)
 Rainer Maria Röhr (Essen, 2022)
 Wilfried Staber (Heidelberg, 2022)
 Jürgen Rust (Mainz)
 Wilma Schmidt (Hanover)

Berliner Kammersänger / Berliner Kammersängerin

The honorary title has been given by the Senate of Berlin since 1962. In the reunified Berlin, from 1990 to 2010, 17 singers have received this honor.
 Dietrich Fischer-Dieskau (1963)
 Sieglinde Wagner (1963)
 Sylvia Geszty (1968)
 Peter Lagger (1970)
 Erika Köth (1970)
 Ingvar Wixell (1970)
 Barry McDaniel (1970)
 Vera Little (1970)
 Gundula Janowitz (1974)
 José van Dam (1974)
 Karl-Josef Hering (1975)
 Catarina Ligendza (1976)
  (1983)
 Uta Priew (1984)
 Jochen Kowalski (1994)
 Karan Armstrong (1994)
 Matti Salminen (1995)
  (1995)
  (1998)
 René Pape (2000)
 Roman Trekel (2000)
  (2001)
 Christiane Oertel (2003)
 Clemens Bieber (2010)
 Reinhard Hagen (2010)
 Lenus Carlson (2010)
 Michaela Kaune (2011)
 Brigitte Geller (2012)
 Peter Renz (2012)
 Jens Larsen (2013)
 Peter Seiffert (2014)
 Dorothea Röschmann (2016)
 Victor von Halem (2016)
 Kwangchul Youn (2018)
 Karolina Gumos (2022)
  (2022)
 Caren van Oijen (2022)
 Tom Erik Lie (2022)
 Evelyn Lear
 Ernst Haefliger
 
 Werner Enders
 Erich Witte

Bayerischer Kammersänger / Bayerische Kammersängerin 

The title has been awarded by the Bavarian Ministry of Culture since 1955 for outstanding artistic achievements to singing soloists of the Bavarian State Opera, the Staatstheater am Gärtnerplatz and the Staatstheater Nürnberg. , more than 130 artists have been honoured.
The prerequisite is at least five years of membership in an ensemble at a state theater or regular guest appearances.

 Gottlob Frick (1954)
 Hans Hotter (1955)
 Erika Köth (1955)
 Hertha Töpper (1955)
 Leonie Rysanek (1956)
 Dietrich Fischer-Dieskau (1959)
 Fritz Wunderlich (1962)
 Kieth Engen (1962)
 Lisa della Casa (1963)
 Inge Borkh (1963)
 Astrid Varnay (1963)
 Karl-Christian Kohn
 Ingeborg Hallstein (1968)
 Birgit Nilsson (1970)
 Brigitte Fassbaender (1970)
 Gisela Ehrensperger (1974)
 Wolfgang Brendel (1976)
 Hermann Winkler (1977)
 Kurt Moll (1979)
 Júlia Várady (1979)
 Willi Brokmeier (1980)
 Edith Mathis (1980)
 Theo Adam (1980)
 Plácido Domingo (1981)
 Lucia Popp (1983)
 Hildegard Behrens (1987)
 Edita Gruberova (1989)
 Peter Seiffert (1992)
 Waltraud Meier (1996)
 Ann Murray (1998)
 Thomas Allen (2003)
 Gabriele Schnaut (2003)
 Matti Salminen (2003)
 Vesselina Kasarova (2005)
 Anja Harteros (2007)
 Diana Damrau (2007)
 Anne Lünenbürger (2008)
 Jonas Kaufmann (2013)
 Wolfgang Koch (2014)
 Christian Gerhaher (2015)
 Jochen Kupfer (2016)
 Anja Kampe (2018)
 Alex Esposito (2020)
 Marlis Petersen (2021)
 Wolfgang Ablinger-Sperrhacke (2021)
  (2021)
 Lucian Krasznec (2021)
  (2021)
 Bo Skovhus (2022)
 Helen Donath

Hamburger Kammersänger / Hamburger Kammersängerin 

Since 1961, the title has been given by the Hamburg Senate. , it has been awarded 28 times since 1928.
 Toni Blankenheim (1961)
 Helga Pilarczyk
 Ursula Boese (1969)
 Plácido Domingo (1975)
 Kurt Moll (1975)
 Franz Grundheber (1986)
 Heinz Kruse (1988)
 Harald Stamm (1988)
 Luciano Pavarotti (1989)
 Bernd Weikl (1993)
 Gabriele Schnaut (1995)
 Andreas Schmidt (1997)
  (2011)
 Gabriele Rossmanith (2011)
 Andrzej Dobber (2015)
  (2017)
  (2017)
  (2017)
 Klaus Florian Vogt (2019)

Sächsischer Kammersänger / Sächsische Kammersängerin 
The title has been for members of the ensembles of the Sächsische Staatsoper Dresden and the Landesbühnen Sachsen since 1998.
 Evelyn Herlitzius (2002)
 Camilla Nylund (2008)
 Georg Zeppenfeld (2015)
 Christa Mayer (2020)
 Günther Leib

Baden-Württembergischer Kammersänger / Baden-Württembergische Kammersängerin
 Reinhold Fritz (1917)
 Marga Höffgen (1976)
  (1977)
 Karan Armstrong (1985)
 Hans Rössling (1988)
 Erich Syri (1989)
  (1993)
  (1996)
  (2001)
 Simone Schneider (2016)
 Yuko Kakuta (2016)
 Liang Li (2016)
 Torsten Hofmann (2016)
 Diana Haller (2021)
 Adam Palka (2021)
 Matthias Wohlbrecht (2022)
 Wolfgang Windgassen
 Fritz Schaetzler

Sweden and Denmark
The equivalent designation in Sweden and Denmark are respectively Hovsångare (male) or Hovsångerska (female) and Kongelige Kammersangere.

References 

Austrian music
German music
Opera terminology
German words and phrases